I Marinella tragouda Mimi Plessa & Gianni Spano (Greek: Η Μαρινέλλα τραγουδά Μίμη Πλέσσα & Γιάννη Σπανό; Marinella in songs of Mimis Plessas and Giannis Spanos) is a compilation by popular Greek singer Marinella. It was released in 1996 in Greece by PolyGram Greece – Mercury and includes 17 recordings of songs composed by Mimis Plessas and Giannis Spanos that Marinella recorded from 1966 to 1984 for PolyGram Records and EMI.

Track listing 
 "Apopse se thelo" (Απόψε σε θέλω) – (Mimis Plessas – Lefteris Papadopoulos) – 3:52
 This song had been released on Otan Simani Esperinos and as a single on 7 July 1969.
 "Anixe petra (na kleisto)" (Άνοιξε πέτρα) – (Mimis Plessas – Lefteris Papadopoulos) – 3:29
 This song had been released on Stalia – Stalia and as a single on 28 November 1968.
 "Ama dite to feggari" (Άμα δείτε το φεγγάρι) – (Mimis Plessas – Lefteris Papadopoulos) – 2:38
 This song had been released on Stalia – Stalia and as a single on 28 November 1968.
 "Zografismena sto charti" (Ζωγραφισμένα στο χαρτί) – (Mimis Plessas – Akos Daskalopoulos) – 2:27
 This song had been released on Ena Tragoudi Ein' I Zoi Mou and as a single on 29 October 1970.
 "To mantalo" (Το μάνταλο) – (Mimis Plessas – Ilias Lymperopoulos) – 2:18
 This song had been released as a single on 7 July 1972.
 "To veloudenio sou to yelekaki" (Το βελουδένιο σου το γελεκάκι) – (Mimis Plessas – Lefteris Papadopoulos) – 2:52
 This song had been released on Otan Simani Esperinos and as a single on 7 July 1969.
 "Thalassa mou" (Θάλασσα μου) – (Mimis Plessas – Akos Daskalopoulos) – 2:17
 This song had been released on Marinella and as a single in 1966.
 "Den pirazi, de variese" (Δεν πειράζει, δε βαριέσαι) – (Mimis Plessas – Ilias Lymperopoulos) – 2:38
 This song had been released as a single on 19 January 1973.
 "Dos mou t' athanato nero" (Δώσ' μου τ' αθάνατο νερό) – (Mimis Plessas – Akos Daskalopoulos) – 3:22
 This song had been released on Ena Tragoudi Ein' I Zoi Mou and as a single on 29 October 1970.
 "Tin ora pou stamatise i vrochi" (Την ώρα που σταμάτησε η βροχή) – (Mimis Plessas – Ilias Lymperopoulos) – 3:03
 This song had been released as a single on 7 July 1972.
 "Eklapsa hthes" (Έκλαψα χθες) – (Mimis Plessas – Akos Daskalopoulos) – 2:37
 This song had been released on Marinella and as a single in 1966.
 "Ke tora" (Και τώρα) – (Mimis Plessas – Ilias Lymperopoulos) – 2:40
 This song had been released as a single on 19 January 1973.
 "Ti vradia mou apopse" (Τη βραδιά μου απόψε) – (Giannis Spanos – Alekos Sakellarios) – 2:26
 This song had been released on Ena Tragoudi Ein' I Zoi Mou on 27 March 1970.
 "O Nontas" (Ο Νώντας) – (Giannis Spanos – Sotia Tsotou) – 2:50
 This song had been released on Ena Tragoudi Ein' I Zoi Mou and as a single on 10 December 1970.
 "Hthes arga" (Χθες αργά) – (Giannis Spanos – Kostas Kotoulas) – 3:10
 This song had been released on Ena Tragoudi Ein' I Zoi Mou on 27 March 1970.
 "Me pnigi touti i siopi" (Με πνίγει τούτη η σιωπή) – (Giannis Spanos – Kostas Kotoulas) – 3:20
 This song had been released on Ena Tragoudi Ein' I Zoi Mou and as a single on 10 December 1970.
 "Pes pos m' antamoses" (Πες πως μ' αντάμωσες) – (Giannis Spanos – Lefteris Papadopoulos) – 4:07
 This song had been released on Megales Stigmes on 29 August 1984.

Personnel 
 Marinella – vocals, background vocals
 Mimis Plessas – arranger, conductor on tracks 1 – 12
 Giannis Spanos – arranger, conductor on tracks 13 – 16
 Kostas Klavvas – arranger, conductor on "Pes pos m' antamoses"
 Yiannis Smyrneos – recording engineer
 PolyGram Records – producer
 Alinta Mavrogeni – photographer
 Petros Paraschis – artwork

References

1996 albums
1996 compilation albums
Marinella compilation albums
Greek-language albums
Universal Music Greece albums